Aftermath is a 2004 Danish drama film directed by Paprika Steen.

Cast 
 Sofie Gråbøl – Britt Lehmann
 Mikael Birkkjær - Claes Lehmann
 Søren Pilmark - Nisse
 Lena Endre - Vivi
 Karen-Lise Mynster - Anette Christoffersen
 Lars Brygmann - Chef
 Carsten Bjørnlund - Ulrik

Plot 
Aftermath is about the emotional trauma of a young couple after the death of their daughter.

Reception 
The film received awards at several film festivals including the Lübeck Nordic Film Days and the Film by the Sea International Festival.

External links 

2004 films
2004 drama films
Danish drama films
2004 directorial debut films